Hsu Yu-fang (born 2 February 1974) is a female Taiwanese long-distance runner. She competed in the marathon event at the 2004 Olympics and the 2015 World Championships in Athletics.

Doping ban
Hsu tested positive for EPO at the National Games in Changhua, Taipei, on 23 October 2011 and was subsequently banned from sports for two years. The ban ended 22 October 2013.

References

External links

1974 births
Living people
Place of birth missing (living people)
Taiwanese female long-distance runners
Athletes (track and field) at the 2004 Summer Olympics
Doping cases in athletics
Olympic athletes of Taiwan
Taiwanese sportspeople in doping cases
World Athletics Championships athletes for Chinese Taipei
Taiwanese female cross country runners